"I Can Love You Like That" is a song written by Steve Diamond, Jennifer Kimball and Maribeth Derry, and recorded by American country music singer John Michael Montgomery.  It was released in February 1995 as the first single from his self-titled CD.  The song reached the top of the Billboard Hot Country Singles & Tracks (now Hot Country Songs) chart.

Music video
The accompanying music video was directed by Marc Ball and premiered in early 1995. The video features a wedding, with John Michael Montgomery singing.

Chart performance
The song debuted at number 59 on the Hot Country Singles & Tracks chart dated March 4, 1995. It charted for twenty weeks and went to Number One on the chart dated April 22, 1995, and stayed there for one week before being replaced by Brooks & Dunn's "Little Miss Honky Tonk" the next week. However, it did go back to Number One on the chart dated May 6, 1995, where it stayed for two more weeks.

Charts

Weekly charts

Year-end charts

All-4-One version

Two months after Montgomery's version hit number one, American male R&B and pop group All-4-One released their version, and it reached a peak of number five on the US Billboard Hot 100 in 1995. It was produced by David Foster, selling 600,000 copies domestically and being certified gold by the RIAA. Despite a live performance on the BBC's long-running music programme Top of the Pops, it only peaked at number 33 on the UK Singles Chart, becoming the band's last top 40 entry there.

Critical reception
Steve Baltin from Cash Box wrote, "All-4-One had one of the biggest hits of last year with the chart-topping "I Swear". The first single from their forthcoming And The Music Speaks album continues the remarkably middle-of-the-road sound they put forth last year. As a result, similar chart success is likely. Though appeal of the same magnitude might be harder to achieve. Simple and Wonder Bread white, “I Can Love You Like That” is a huge ballad."

Track listing
 CD single – Europe (1995)
 "I Can Love You Like That" (Edit) – 3:51 	
 "All-4-1" (Non-LP Bonus Track) – 5:24 	
 "I Can Love You Like That" (LP Version) – 4:23

Charts

Weekly charts

Year-end charts

References

1995 singles
1995 songs
John Michael Montgomery songs
All-4-One songs
Songs written by Maribeth Derry
Songs written by Steve Diamond (songwriter)
Songs written by Jennifer Kimball
Song recordings produced by Scott Hendricks
Atlantic Records singles
Country ballads
Pop ballads
Contemporary R&B ballads
Song recordings produced by David Foster